Charles Michael Healy (5 September 1899 – 18 March 1985) was  a former Australian rules footballer who played with North Melbourne in the Victorian Football League (VFL).

Notes

External links 

1899 births
1985 deaths
Australian rules footballers from Melbourne
North Melbourne Football Club players
People from Flemington, Victoria